A soap shaker is a box entirely made from wire metal mesh with a handle. The box may be opened so as to be able to place in this box a piece or pieces of bar soap. These may be pieces that have become too small to be used as hand soap.

The box may now be securely closed. Held by its handle the box may be vigorously shaken in a water filled bucket or other container. The shaking will move the water through the box. The result is that the water will become soapy, rich with suds to be used for all kinds of cleaning purposes. This way even small pieces of bar soap could be re-used and are not wasted.

The use of a soap shaker was common early to mid 20th century. The invention and sale of powdered or liquid soap diminished its use.

External links 
 Patent with description

Recycling
Laundry equipment
Soaps
Cleaning tools